Dieter Mirnegg (born 24 May 1954) is an Austrian retired footballer and coach.

References

External links
 Dieter Mirnegg at sturmarchiv.at 
 Dieter Mirnegg at austriasoccer.at 

1954 births
Living people
Austrian footballers
Austria international footballers
Association football defenders
Austrian Football Bundesliga players
Bundesliga players
Serie A players
MSV Duisburg players
Como 1907 players
Wiener Sport-Club players
SK Vorwärts Steyr players
Austrian football managers
FC Linz managers